"Bar" is a song by Argentine singer Tini and Argentine rapper L-Gante. The song and its music video were released by Sony Music Latin and Hollywood Records on November 11, 2021, as the third single from her fourth studio album, Cupido (2023). It was written by the two singers, alongside Elena Rose, Kevin Rivas and its producers Mauricio Rengifo and Andrés Torres. Tini and L-Gante collaborate for the first time on that highly danceable and playful song, which is combination of reggaeton and cumbia genre.

Background and composition 
Tini and L-Gante collaborate for the first time on "Bar". The artists announced the launch from their social networks. On November 8, 2021, Tini released the first teaser for the song, and revealed that it will be a collaboration with singer of cumbia L-Gante, and how the song coming out on November 11, 2021. Later, both artists also posted two more teasers on their social media accounts. "One day and this summer bomb comes out," wrote L-Gante on his social networks 24 hours before the premiere of the song. For her part, Tini wrote on Twitter a part of the chorus of the song, "Porque otra boca voy a besar" witch means "Because I'm going to kiss another mouth." On November 11, the song was released on Tini's YouTube channel. The song is about how girl left her boyfriend at the bar, and he suffers for her, while she lives the best years of her life. The song is combination of reggaeton and cumbia better known as cachengue sound, that these two artists often perform in their latest songs and which is a typical music genre that representing Latin American music.

Music video 
The shoot of the music video took place in Argentina. It was Directed by Argentine director Diego Peskins, who was also in charge of the video for "Miénteme", the video for "Bar" shows a party atmosphere, where luxury cars and lots of nighttime fun appear. In the video clip we see the Argentine duo arriving at a mansion where they are greeted by a luxurious party. Neon lights, elegant clothes and bottles of champagne are part of the visual elements of the video. Suddenly, the aesthetic changes completely. We see Tini in a much more casual outfit in what looks like a "popular bowling alley." Accompanied by some dancers, she begins a coordinated choreography.

Credits and personnel 
Credits adapted from Genius.

 Tini – lead vocals, songwriter
 L-Gante – vocals, songwriter
 Tom Norris – mixing engineer, mastering engineer
 Elena Rose – songwriter
 Kevin Rivas – songwriter
 Mauricio Rengifo – producer, songwriter, recording engineer, programming 
 Sergio Rivas –  recording engineer
 Andrés Torres – producer, songwriter, recording engineer, programming

Charts

Weekly charts

Monthly charts

Certifications

See also
 List of airplay number-one hits of the 2010s (Argentina)
 List of Billboard Argentina Hot 100 number-one singles of 2021
 List of Billboard Argentina Hot 100 number-one singles of 2022

References

2021 songs
2021 singles
Spanish-language songs
Reggaeton songs
Tini (singer) songs
Songs written by Elena Rose
Songs written by Andrés Torres (producer)
Song recordings produced by Andrés Torres (producer)
Songs written by Mauricio Rengifo
Sony Music singles
Sony Music Latin singles
Hollywood Records singles
Argentina Hot 100 number-one singles
Number-one singles in Argentina